Harry Julius Shearer (born December 23, 1943) is an American actor, comedian, writer, musician, radio host, director and producer. Born in Los Angeles, California, Shearer began his career as a child actor. From 1969 to 1976, Shearer was a member of The Credibility Gap, a radio comedy group. Following the breakup of the group, Shearer co-wrote the film Real Life (1979) with Albert Brooks and worked as a writer on Martin Mull's television series Fernwood 2 Night.

Shearer was a cast member on Saturday Night Live between 1979 and 1980, and 1984 and 1985. Shearer co-created, co-wrote and co-starred in the film This Is Spinal Tap (1984), a satirical rockumentary, which became a hit. In 1989, he joined the cast of the animated sitcom The Simpsons; he provides voices for characters including Mr. Burns, Smithers, Principal Skinner, Ned Flanders, Reverend Lovejoy, Kent Brockman, formerly Dr. Hibbert, and more. Shearer has appeared in films including The Truman Show (1998) and A Mighty Wind (2003), and has directed two, Teddy Bears' Picnic (2002) and The Big Uneasy (2010). Since 1983, Shearer has been the host of the public radio comedy/music program Le Show, incorporating satire, music, and sketch comedy. He has written three books.

Shearer has won a Primetime Emmy Award and has received several other Emmy and Grammy Award nominations. He has been married to singer-songwriter Judith Owen since 1993. He became an artist in residence at Loyola University, New Orleans in 2013.

Early life
Shearer was born December 23, 1943, in Los Angeles, California, the son of Dora, a bookkeeper, and Mack Shearer. His parents were Jewish immigrants from Austria and Poland. Starting when Shearer was four years old, he had a piano teacher whose daughter worked as a child actress. The piano teacher later decided to make a career change and become a children's agent, since she knew people in the business through her daughter's work. The teacher asked Shearer's parents for permission to take him to an audition. Several months later, she called Shearer's parents and told them that she had gotten Shearer an audition for the radio show The Jack Benny Program. Shearer received the role when he was seven years old. He described Jack Benny as "very warm and approachable ... He was a guy who dug the idea of other people on the show getting laughs, which sort of spoiled me for other people in comedy." Shearer said in an interview that one person who took him "under his wing" and was his mentor during his early days in show business was voice actor Mel Blanc, who voiced many animated characters, including Bugs Bunny, Daffy Duck and Barney Rubble. Shearer made his film debut in the film Abbott and Costello Go to Mars (1953), in which he had a small part, and appeared in The Robe (also 1953). Throughout his childhood and teenage years he worked in television, film, and radio. 

In 1957, Shearer played the precursor to the Eddie Haskell character in the pilot episode of the television series Leave It to Beaver. After the filming, Shearer's parents said they did not want him to be a regular in a series. Instead they wanted him to just do occasional work so that he could have a normal childhood. Shearer and his parents made the decision not to accept the role in the series if it was picked up by a television network.

Shearer graduated from Los Angeles High School and attended UCLA as a political science major in the early 1960s and decided to quit show business to become a "serious person". However, he says this lasted approximately a month, and he joined the staff of the Daily Bruin, UCLA's school newspaper, during his first year. He was editor of the college humor magazine (Satyr), including the June 1964 parody Preyboy. He also worked as a newscaster at KRLA, a top 40 radio station in Pasadena, during this period. According to Shearer, after graduating, he had "a very serious agenda going on, and it was 'Stay Out of the Draft'." He attended graduate school at Harvard University for one year and worked at the state legislature in Sacramento. In 1967 and 1968, he was a high school teacher, teaching English and social studies. He left teaching following "disagreements with the administration".

From 1969 to 1976, Shearer was a member of The Credibility Gap, a radio comedy group that included David Lander, Richard Beebe and Michael McKean. The group consisted of "a bunch of newsmen" at KRLA 1110, "the number two station" in Los Angeles. They wanted to do more than just straight news, so they hired comedians who were talented vocalists. Shearer heard about it from a friend so he brought over a tape to the station and nervously gave it to the receptionist. He found out he was hired that same day. The group's radio show was canceled in 1970 by KRLA and in 1971 by KPPC-FM, so they started performing in various clubs and concert venues. While at KRLA, Shearer also interviewed Creedence Clearwater Revival for the Pop Chronicles music documentary. 

In 1973, Shearer appeared as Jim Houseafire on How Time Flys, an album by The Firesign Theatre's David Ossman. The Credibility Gap broke up in 1976 when Lander and McKean left to perform in the sitcom Laverne & Shirley. Shearer started working with Albert Brooks, producing one of Brooks' albums and co-writing the film Real Life (1979). Shearer also started writing for Martin Mull's television series Fernwood 2 Night. In the mid-1970s, he started working with Rob Reiner on a pilot for ABC. The show, which starred Christopher Guest, Tom Leopold and McKean, was not picked up.

Career

Saturday Night Live
In August 1979, Shearer was hired as a writer and cast member on Saturday Night Live, one of the first additions to the original 1975 cast, and an unofficial replacement for John Belushi and Dan Aykroyd, who were both leaving the show. Al Franken recommended Shearer to Saturday Night Live creator Lorne Michaels. Shearer describes his experience on the show as a "living hell" and "not a real pleasant place to work." He did not get along well with the other writers and cast members and states that he was not included with the cast in the opening montage (although he was added to the montage for later episodes of the 1979–80 season) and that Lorne Michaels had told the rest of the cast that he was just a writer. Michaels left Saturday Night Live at the end of the fifth season, taking the entire cast with him. Shearer told new executive producer Jean Doumanian that he was "not a fan of Lorne's" and offered to stay with the show if he was given the chance to overhaul the program and bring in experienced comedians, like Christopher Guest. However, Doumanian turned him down, so he decided to leave with the rest of the cast.

In 1984, while promoting the film This Is Spinal Tap, Shearer, Christopher Guest and Michael McKean performed on Saturday Night Live. All three members were offered the chance to join the show in the 1984–1985 season. Shearer accepted because he was treated well by the producers and he thought the backstage environment had improved but later stated that he "didn't realize that guests are treated better than the regulars." Guest also accepted the offer while McKean rejected it, although he would join the cast in 1994. Dick Ebersol, who replaced Lorne Michaels as the show's producer, said that Shearer was "a gifted performer but a pain in the butt. He's just so demanding on the preciseness of things and he's very, very hard on the working people. He's just a nightmare-to-deal-with person." In January 1985, Shearer left the show for good, partially because he felt he was not being used enough. Martin Short said Shearer "wanted to be creative and Dick [Ebersol] wanted something else. ... I think he felt his voice wasn't getting represented on the show. When he wouldn't get that chance, it made him very upset."

Spinal Tap
Shearer co-created, co-wrote and co-starred in Rob Reiner's film This Is Spinal Tap (1984). Shearer, Reiner, Michael McKean and Christopher Guest received a deal to write a first draft of a screenplay for a company called Marble Arch. They decided that the film could not be written and instead filmed a 20-minute demo of what they wanted to do. It was eventually greenlighted by Norman Lear and Jerry Perenchio at Embassy Pictures. The film satirizes the wild personal behavior and musical pretensions of hard rock and heavy metal bands, as well as the hagiographic tendencies of rockumentaries of the time. The three core members of the band Spinal Tap—David St. Hubbins, Derek Smalls and Nigel Tufnel—were portrayed by McKean, Shearer and Guest respectively. The three actors play their musical instruments and speak with mock English accents throughout the film. There was no script, although there was a written breakdown of most of the scenes, and many of the lines were ad-libbed. It was filmed in 25 days.

Shearer said in an interview that "The animating impulse was to do rock 'n' roll right. The four of us had been around rock 'n' roll and we were just amazed by how relentlessly the movies got it wrong. Because we were funny people it was going to be a funny film, but we wanted to get it right." When they tried to sell it to various Hollywood studios, they were told that the film would not work. The group kept saying, "No, this is a story that's pretty familiar to people. We're not introducing them to anything they don't really know," so Shearer thought it would at least have some resonance with the public. The film was only a modest success upon its initial release but found greater success, and developed a cult following, after its video release. In 2000, the film was ranked 29th on the American Film Institute's list of the top 100 comedy movies in American cinema and it was selected for preservation in the United States National Film Registry by the Library of Congress as being "culturally, historically, or aesthetically significant".

Shearer, Guest and McKean have since worked on several projects as their Spinal Tap characters. They released three albums: This Is Spinal Tap (1984), Break Like the Wind (1992) and Back from the Dead (2009). In 1992, Spinal Tap appeared in an episode of The Simpsons called "The Otto Show". The band has played several concerts, including at Live Earth in London on July 7, 2007. In anticipation of the show, Rob Reiner directed a short film entitled Spinal Tap. In 2009, the band released Back from the Dead to commemorate the 25th anniversary of the release of the film. The album features re-recorded versions of songs featured in This Is Spinal Tap and its soundtrack, and five new songs. The band performed a one-date "world tour" at London's Wembley Arena on June 30, 2009. The Folksmen, a mock band featured in the film A Mighty Wind that is also made up of characters played by Shearer, McKean and Guest, was the opening act for the show.

The Simpsons
Shearer is known for his work as a voice actor on The Simpsons. Matt Groening, the creator of the show, was a fan of Shearer's work, while Shearer was a fan of a column Groening used to write. When approached by Groening to be in the series, Shearer was initially reluctant because he thought the recording sessions would be too much trouble. He felt that voice acting was "not a lot of fun" as, traditionally, voice actors record their parts separately. He was told that the actors would record their lines together, and after three phone calls for executive producer James L. Brooks, Shearer was convinced to join the cast of The Simpsons. Shearer's first impression of The Simpsons was that it was funny. He – who thought it was a "pretty cool" way to work – found it peculiar that his fellow cast members were adamant about not being known to the public as the people behind the voices.

Shearer provides voices for Principal Skinner, Kent Brockman, Mr. Burns, Waylon Smithers, Ned Flanders, Reverend Lovejoy, formerly Dr. Hibbert, Lenny Leonard, Otto Mann, Rainier Wolfcastle, Scratchy, Kang, Dr. Marvin Monroe, and Judge Snyder, among others. He has described all of his regular characters' voices as "easy to slip into. ... I wouldn't do them if they weren't easy." Shearer modeled Mr. Burns's voice on the two actors Lionel Barrymore and Ronald Reagan. Shearer says that Burns is the most difficult character for him to voice because it is rough on his vocal cords and he often needs to drink tea and honey to soothe his voice. He describes Burns as his favorite character, saying he "like[s] Mr. Burns because he is pure evil. A lot of evil people make the mistake of diluting it. Never adulterate your evil." Shearer is also the voice of Burns' assistant Smithers, and is able to perform dialogue between the two characters in one take. In the episode "Bart's Inner Child", Shearer said "wow" in the voice of Otto, which was then used when Otto was seen jumping on a trampoline. Ned Flanders had been meant to be just a neighbor that Homer Simpson was jealous of, but because Shearer used "such a sweet voice" for him, Flanders was broadened to become a Christian and a sweet guy that someone would prefer to live next to over Homer. Dr. Marvin Monroe's voice was based on psychiatrist David Viscott. Monroe has been largely retired since the seventh season barring a few cameo appearances because voicing the character strained Shearer's throat.

In 2004, Shearer criticized what he perceived as the show's declining quality: "I rate the last three seasons as among the worst, so season four looks very good to me now." Shearer has also been vocal about "The Principal and the Pauper" (season nine, episode two, 1997), one of the most controversial episodes of The Simpsons. Many fans and critics reacted negatively to the revelation that Principal Seymour Skinner, a recurring character since the first season, was an impostor. The episode has been criticized by both Shearer and Groening. In a 2001 interview, Shearer recalled that after reading the script, he told the writers, "That's so wrong. You're taking something that an audience has built eight years or nine years of investment in and just tossed it in the trash can for no good reason, for a story we've done before with other characters. It's so arbitrary and gratuitous, and it's disrespectful to the audience." In a December 2006 interview, Shearer added, "Now, [the writers] refuse to talk about it. They realize it was a horrible mistake. They never mention it. It's like they're punishing [the audience] for paying attention."

Due to scheduling and availability conflicts, Shearer decided not to participate in The Simpsons Ride, which opened in 2008, so none of his characters have vocal parts and many do not appear in the ride at all. In a 2010 interview on The Howard Stern Show, Shearer alluded that the reason he was not part of the ride was because he would not be getting paid for it. Similarly, Shearer was unable to appear in the Family Guy crossover episode "The Simpsons Guy" due to further scheduling conflicts. Therefore, his characters are again mute. When asked about how he felt about the crossover, Shearer replied, "Matter and anti-matter."

Until 1998, Shearer was paid $30,000 per episode. During a pay dispute in 1998, Fox threatened to replace the six main voice actors with new actors, going as far as preparing for casting of new voices. The dispute, however, was resolved and Shearer received $125,000 per episode until 2004, when the voice actors demanded that they be paid $360,000 an episode. The dispute was resolved a month later, and Shearer's pay rose to $250,000 per episode. After salary re-negotiations in 2008, the voice actors received $400,000 per episode. Three years later, with Fox threatening to cancel the series unless production costs were cut, Shearer and the other cast members accepted a 30% pay cut, down to just over $300,000 per episode. On May 14, 2015, Shearer announced he was leaving the show. After the other voice actors signed a contract for the same pay, Shearer refused, stating it was not enough. Al Jean made a statement from the producers saying "the show must go on," but did not elaborate on what might happen to the characters Shearer voiced. On July 7, 2015, Shearer agreed to continue with the show, on the same terms as the other voice actors.

Wild Discovery

Shearer is also known for his work as a narrator on Wild Discovery.

Le Show and radio work

Since 1983, Shearer has been the host of the public radio comedy/music program Le Show. The program is a hodgepodge of satirical news commentary, music, and sketch comedy that takes aim at the "mega morons of the mighty media". It is carried on many National Public Radio and other public radio stations throughout the United States. Since the merger of SIRIUS and XM satellite radio services the program is no longer available on either. The show has also been made available as a podcast on iTunes and by WWNO. On the weekly program Shearer alternates between DJing, reading and commenting on the news of the day after the manner of Mort Sahl, and performing original (mostly political) comedy sketches and songs. In 2008, Shearer released a music CD called Songs of the Bushmen, consisting of his satirical numbers about former President George W. Bush on Le Show. Shearer says he criticizes both Republicans and Democrats equally, and also says that "the iron law of doing comedy about politics is you make fun of whoever is running the place" and that "everyone else is just running around talking. They are the ones who are actually doing something, changing people's lives for better or for worse. Other people the media calls 'satirists' don't work that way."

Since encountering satellite news feeds when he worked on Saturday Night Live, Shearer has been fascinated with the contents of the video that does not air. Shearer refers to these clips as found objects. "I thought, wow, there is just an unending supply of this material, and it's wonderful and fascinating and funny and sometimes haunting – but it's always good," said Shearer. He collects this material and uses it on Le Show and on his website. In 2008, he assembled video clips of newsmakers from this collection into an art installation titled "The Silent Echo Chamber" which was exhibited at The Aldrich Contemporary Art Museum in Ridgefield, Connecticut. The exhibit was also displayed in 2009 at Institut Valencià d'Art Modern (IVAM) in Valencia, Spain and in 2010 at the New Orleans Contemporary Arts Center.

In 2006 Shearer appeared with Brian Hayes in four episodes of the BBC Radio 4 sitcom Not Today, Thank You, playing Nostrils, a man so ugly he cannot stand to be in his own presence. He was originally scheduled to appear in all six episodes but had to withdraw from recording two due to a problem with his work permit. On June 19, 2008, it was announced that Shearer would receive a star on the Hollywood Walk of Fame in the radio category.

Further career

Shearer's first feature film as director, Teddy Bears' Picnic, which he also wrote, was released in 2002. The plot is based on Bohemian Grove, which hosts a three-week encampment of some of the most powerful men in the world. The film was not well received by critics. It garnered a 0% approval rating on Rotten Tomatoes, with all 19 reviews being determined as negative and received a rating of 32 out of 100 (signifying "generally negative reviews") on Metacritic from 10 reviews. In 2003, he co-wrote J. Edgar! The Musical with Tom Leopold, which spoofed J. Edgar Hoover's relationship with Clyde Tolson. It premiered at the U.S. Comedy Arts Festival in Aspen, Colorado and starred Kelsey Grammer and John Goodman.

Shearer, Guest and McKean starred in the folk music mockumentary A Mighty Wind (2003), portraying a band called The Folksmen. The film was written by Guest and Eugene Levy, and directed by Guest. Shearer had a major role in the Guest-directed parody of Oscar politicking For Your Consideration released in 2006. He played Victor Allan Miller, a veteran actor who is convinced that he is going to be nominated for an Academy Award. He also appeared as a news anchor in Godzilla (1998) with fellow The Simpsons cast members Hank Azaria and Nancy Cartwright. His other film appearances include The Right Stuff (1983), The Fisher King (1991), The Truman Show (1998), Small Soldiers (also 1998), and EdTV (1999). He also directed and appeared in the television program Portrait of a White Marriage (1988), a sequel to The History of White People in America.

Shearer has also worked as a columnist for the Los Angeles Times Magazine, but decided that it "became such a waste of time to bother with it." His columns have also been published in Slate and Newsweek. Since May 2005 he has been a contributing blogger at The Huffington Post. Shearer has written three books. Man Bites Town, published in 1993, is a collection of columns that he wrote for The Los Angeles Times between 1989 and 1992. Published in 1999, It's the Stupidity, Stupid analyzed the hatred some people had for then-President Bill Clinton. Shearer believes that Clinton became disliked because he had an affair with "the least powerful, least credentialed woman cleared into his official compound." His most recent book is Not Enough Indians, his first novel. Published in 2006, it is a comic novel about Native Americans and gambling. Without the "pleasures of collaboration" and "spontaneity and improvisation which characterize his other projects", Not Enough Indians was a "struggle" for Shearer to write. He said that "the only fun thing about it was having written it. It was lonely, I had no deal for it and it took six years to do. It was a profoundly disturbing act of self-discipline."

Shearer has released five solo comedy albums: It Must Have Been Something I Said (1994), Dropping Anchors (2006), Songs Pointed and Pointless (2007), Songs of the Bushmen (2008) and Greed and Fear (2010). His most recent CD, Greed and Fear is mainly about Wall Street economic issues, rather than politics like his previous albums. Shearer decided to make the album when he"started getting amused by the language of the economic meltdown – when 'toxic assets' suddenly became 'troubled assets,' going from something poisoning the system to just a bunch of delinquent youth with dirty faces that needed not removal from the system but just ... understanding." In May 2006, Shearer received an honorary doctorate from Goucher College.

The Big Uneasy

Shearer is the director of The Big Uneasy (2010), a documentary film about the impacts of Hurricane Katrina on New Orleans.  Narrated by actor John Goodman, the film describes levee failures and catastrophic flooding in the New Orleans metropolitan area, and includes extended interviews with former LSU professor Ivor Van Heerden, Robert Bea, an engineering professor at the University of California at Berkeley, and Maria Garzino, an engineer and contract specialist for the Los Angeles district of the U.S. Army Corps of Engineers.  The film is critical of the U.S. Army Corps of Engineers and its management of flood protection projects in Southern Louisiana. Shearer draws on numerous technical experts to maintain that Hurricane Katrina's "... tragic floods creating widespread damage were caused by manmade errors in engineering and judgment." On review aggregator Rotten Tomatoes, the film has an approval rating of 71% based on 24 reviews, with an average rating of 6.85/10. The website's critical consensus reads, "The Big Uneasy offers an admittedly uneven – yet still worthy and well-intentioned – look at a horrific disaster's aftermath."

Personal life
Shearer married folk singer Penelope Nichols in 1974. They divorced in 1977. He has been married to Welsh singer-songwriter Judith Owen since 1993. In 2005, the couple launched their own record label called Courgette Records. Shearer primarily resides in the French Quarter of New Orleans, Louisiana, but has homes in Santa Monica, California and Notting Hill, London. He first went to New Orleans in 1988 and has attended every New Orleans Jazz & Heritage Festival since.

Shearer often speaks and writes about the failure of the Federal levee system which flooded New Orleans during Hurricane Katrina, blasting the coverage of it in the mainstream media and criticizing the role of the United States Army Corps of Engineers. Prior to the DVD release of his film, The Big Uneasy, Shearer would hold screenings of the film at different venues and take questions from audience members.

Filmography

Film

Television

Video games

Web

Music video

Discography

Bibliography

Awards
Shearer was the last of the six regular voice actors from The Simpsons to win the Primetime Emmy Award for Outstanding Character Voice-Over Performance. His win came for the season 25 episode "Four Regrettings and a Funeral".

References

Bibliography
.

External links

Harry Shearer's official site

Harry Shearer's blog at the Huffington Post
Harry Shearer  at Voice Chasers 
New Documentary, Shearer on Hurricane Katrina – video interview by Democracy Now!
Harry Shearer Interview NAMM Oral History Library (2017)

1943 births
Living people
20th-century American comedians
20th-century American male actors
21st-century American comedians
21st-century American male actors
American comedy musicians
American documentary filmmakers
American impressionists (entertainers)
American male child actors
American male film actors
American male radio actors
American male television actors
American male television writers
American male video game actors
American male voice actors
American people of Austrian-Jewish descent
American people of Polish-Jewish descent
American radio personalities
American satirists
American sketch comedians
American television writers
Audiobook narrators
Comedians from California
Harvard University alumni
HuffPost bloggers
Jewish American male comedians
Jewish American male actors
Louisiana Democrats
Male actors from Los Angeles
Musicians from Los Angeles
Primetime Emmy Award winners
Screenwriters from California
University of California, Los Angeles alumni